Pomán is a  department of Catamarca Province in Argentina.

Settlements

Saujil
Saujil
Colpes
San José
Joyango
San Miguel
Las Casitas
Rincón
Michango
Siján
Villages of the field (Tucumanao, and others)

Mutquín
Mutquín
Apoyaco

Pomán
Villa de Pomán
Rosario de Colana
Retiro de Colana 
El Pajonal

External links
Pomán Webpage (Spanish)

Departments of Catamarca Province